An adverse drug reaction (ADR) is a harmful, unintended result caused by taking medication. ADRs may occur following a single dose or prolonged administration of a drug or result from the combination of two or more drugs. The meaning of this term differs from the term "side effect" because side effects can be beneficial as well as detrimental. The study of ADRs is the concern of the field known as pharmacovigilance. An adverse event (AE) refers to any unexpected and inappropriate occurrence at the time a drug is used, whether or not associated with the administration of the drug. An ADR is a special type of AE in which a causative relationship can be shown.  ADRs are only one type of medication-related harm, as harm can also be caused by omitting to take indicated medications.

Classification
ADRs may be classified by e.g. cause and severity.

Cause
Type A: Augmented pharmacologic effects - dose dependent and predictable
Type A reactions, which constitute approximately 80% of adverse drug reactions, are usually a consequence of the drug's primary pharmacological effect (e.g. bleeding when using the anticoagulant warfarin) or a low therapeutic index of the drug (e.g. nausea from digoxin), and they are therefore predictable. They are dose-related and usually mild, although they may be serious or even fatal (e.g. intracranial bleeding from warfarin). Such reactions are usually due to inappropriate dosage, especially when drug elimination is impaired. The term 'side effects' is often applied to minor type A reactions.

 Type B: Idiosyncratic
Types A and B were proposed in the 1970s, and the other types were proposed subsequently when the first two proved insufficient to classify ADRs.

Seriousness
The U.S Food and Drug Administration defines a serious adverse event as one when the patient outcome is one of the following:
 Death
 Life-threatening
 Hospitalization (initial or prolonged)
 Disability - significant, persistent, or permanent change, impairment, damage or disruption in the patient's body function/structure, physical activities or quality of life.
 Congenital abnormality
 Requires intervention to prevent permanent impairment or damage

Severity is a point on an arbitrary scale of intensity of the adverse event in question.  The terms "severe" and "serious", when applied to adverse events, are technically very different. They are easily confused but can not be used interchangeably, requiring care in usage.

A headache is severe if it causes intense pain. There are scales like "visual analog scale" that help clinicians assess the severity. On the other hand, a headache is not usually serious (but may be in case of subarachnoid haemorrhage, subdural bleed, even a migraine may temporally fit criteria), unless it also satisfies the criteria for seriousness listed above.

Location
Adverse effects may be local, i.e. limited to a certain location, or systemic, where medication has caused adverse effects throughout the systemic circulation.

For instance, some ocular antihypertensives cause systemic effects, although they are administered locally as eye drops, since a fraction escapes to the systemic circulation.

Mechanisms

As research better explains the biochemistry of drug use, fewer ADRs are Type B and more are Type A. Common mechanisms are:
 Abnormal pharmacokinetics due to
 genetic factors
 comorbid disease states
 Synergistic effects between either
 a drug and a disease
 two drugs
Antagonism effects between either 
a drug and a disease 
 two drugs

Abnormal pharmacokinetics

Comorbid disease states
Various diseases, especially those that cause renal or hepatic insufficiency, may alter drug metabolism. Resources are available that report changes in a drug's metabolism due to disease states.

The Medication Appropriateness Tool for Comorbid Health Conditions in Dementia (MATCH-D) criteria warns that people with dementia are more likely to experience adverse effects, and that they are less likely to be able to reliably report symptoms.

Genetic factors
Abnormal drug metabolism may be due to inherited factors of either Phase I oxidation or Phase II conjugation. Pharmacogenomics is the study of the inherited basis for abnormal drug reactions.

Phase I reactions
Inheriting abnormal alleles of cytochrome P450 can alter drug metabolism. Tables are available to check for drug interactions due to P450 interactions.

Inheriting abnormal butyrylcholinesterase (pseudocholinesterase) may affect metabolism of drugs such as succinylcholine

Phase II reactions
Inheriting abnormal N-acetyltransferase which conjugated some drugs to facilitate excretion may affect the metabolism of drugs such as isoniazid, hydralazine, and procainamide.

Inheriting abnormal thiopurine S-methyltransferase may affect the metabolism of the thiopurine drugs mercaptopurine and azathioprine.

Interactions with other drugs
The risk of drug interactions is increased with polypharmacy.

Protein binding
These interactions are usually transient and mild until a new steady state is achieved. These are mainly for drugs without much first-pass liver metabolism. The principal plasma proteins for drug binding are:
 albumin
 α1-acid glycoprotein
 lipoproteins
Some drug interactions with warfarin are due to changes in protein binding.

Cytochrome P450
Patients have abnormal metabolism by cytochrome P450 due to either inheriting abnormal alleles or due to drug interactions. Tables are available to check for drug interactions due to P450 interactions.

Synergistic effects
An example of synergism is two drugs that both prolong the QT interval.

Assessing causality
Causality assessment is used to determine the likelihood that a drug caused a suspected ADR. There are a number of different methods used to judge causation, including the Naranjo algorithm, the Venulet algorithm and the WHO causality term assessment criteria. Each have pros and cons associated with their use and most require some level of expert judgement to apply.
An ADR should not be labeled as 'certain' unless the ADR abates with a challenge-dechallenge-rechallenge protocol (stopping and starting the agent in question). The chronology of the onset of the suspected ADR is important, as another substance or factor may be implicated as a cause; co-prescribed medications and underlying psychiatric conditions may be factors in the ADR.

Assigning causality to a specific agent often proves difficult, unless the event is found during a clinical study or large databases are used. Both methods have difficulties and can be fraught with error. Even in clinical studies some ADRs may be missed as large numbers of test individuals are required to find that adverse drug reaction. Psychiatric ADRs are often missed as they are grouped together in the questionnaires used to assess the population.

Monitoring bodies
Many countries have official bodies that monitor drug safety and reactions. On an international level, the WHO runs the Uppsala Monitoring Centre, and the European Union runs the European Medicines Agency (EMA). In the United States, the Food and Drug Administration (FDA) is responsible for monitoring post-marketing studies.
In Canada, the Marketed Health Products Directorate of Health Canada is responsible for the surveillance of marketed health products. In Australia, the Therapeutic Goods Administration (TGA) conducts postmarket monitoring of therapeutic products.  In the UK the Yellow Card Scheme was established in 1963.

Epidemiology
A study by the Agency for Healthcare Research and Quality (AHRQ) found that in 2011, sedatives and hypnotics were a leading source for adverse drug events seen in the hospital setting.  Approximately 2.8% of all ADEs present on admission and 4.4% of ADEs that originated during a hospital stay were caused by a sedative or hypnotic drug.  A second study by AHRQ found that in 2011, the most common specifically identified causes of adverse drug events that originated during hospital stays in the U.S. were steroids, antibiotics, opiates/narcotics, and anticoagulants. Patients treated in urban teaching hospitals had higher rates of ADEs involving antibiotics and opiates/narcotics compared to those treated in urban nonteaching hospitals.  Those treated in private, nonprofit hospitals had higher rates of most ADE causes compared to patients treated in public or private, for-profit hospitals.

MRH is common after hospital discharge in older adults, but methodological inconsistencies between studies and a paucity of data on risk factors limits clear understanding of the epidemiology. There was a wide range in incidence, from 0.4% to 51.2% of participants, and 35% to 59% of harm was preventable. Medication related harm incidence within 30 days after discharge ranged from 167 to 500 events per 1,000 individuals discharged (17–51% of individuals).

In the U.S., females had a higher rate of ADEs involving opiates and narcotics than males in 2011, while male patients had a higher rate of anticoagulant ADEs.  Nearly 8 in 1,000 adults aged 65 years or older experienced one of the four most common ADEs (steroids, antibiotics, opiates/narcotics, and anticoagulants) during hospitalization. A study showed that 48% of patients had an adverse drug reaction to at least one drug, and pharmacist involvement helps to pick up adverse drug reactions.

In 2012, McKinsey & Company concluded that the cost of the 50-100 million preventable error-related adverse drug events would be between US$18–115 billion.

See also 

 Alleged problems in the drug approval process
 Classification of Pharmaco-Therapeutic Referrals
 Drug therapy problems
 EudraVigilance (European Union)
 History of pharmacy
 Iatrogenesis
 Lethal dose
 List of withdrawn drugs
 Paradoxical reaction
 Polypharmacy
 Toxicity
 Toxicology
 The Medical Letter on Drugs and Therapeutics
 Yellow Card Scheme (UK)

References

Further reading 
Incidence of adverse drug reactions in human immune deficiency virus-positive patients using highly active antiretroviral therapy

External links 

Pharmacy
Clinical pharmacology
Drug safety